Kalamos is a town and a former community in East Attica, Greece. Since the 2011 local government reform it is part of the municipality Oropos, of which it is a municipal unit. The municipal unit has an area of 44.878 km2. Kalamos has historically been an Arvanite settlement.

Geography

Kalamos is located 2 km from the South Euboean Gulf coast. The seaside village Agioi Apostoloi, 4 km to the east, is also part of the community of Kalamos. Kalamos is 4 km east of Markopoulo Oropou, 8 km north of Kapandriti and 36 km northeast of Athens city center.

Settlements
 Agioi Apostoloi (pop. 1,904 in 2011)
 Kalamos (pop. 1,824)

Historical population

References

External links
GTP Travel Pages (Community)

Populated places in East Attica
Oropos
Arvanite settlements